The Munsingwear Open KSB Cup was a professional golf tournament on the Japan Golf Tour. It was created in 2000 as a result of the merger of two previous tournaments, the Georgia KSB Open and the Descente Classic Munsingwear Cup.

The Georgia KSB Open started in 1989, and the Descente Classic Munsingwear Cup started in 1992. From 2004, the tournament was played at the Tojigaoka Marine Hills Golf Club near Tamano, Okayama. The purse for 2008 was ¥100,000,000, with ¥20,000,000 going to the winner.

At the 2007 Munsingwear Open KSB Cup, Ryo Ishikawa, an amateur, became the youngest ever winner on the Japan Golf Tour, aged 15 years and 8 months.

Tournament hosts

Winners

References

External links
Coverage on Japan Golf Tour's official site

Defunct golf tournaments in Japan
Former Japan Golf Tour events
Sport in Okayama Prefecture
Recurring sporting events established in 2000
Recurring sporting events disestablished in 2008
2000 establishments in Japan
2008 disestablishments in Japan